Leptadrillia quisqualis is a species of sea snail, a marine gastropod mollusk in the family Drilliidae.

Description
The shell grows to a length of 11 mm. The white shell is obtusely angulated, smooth above the angle, which is nodose by the termination of short longitudinal ribs.

Distribution
This species occurs in the demersal zone of the Pacific Ocean off Nicaragua. Clathurella quisqalis (Hinds, 1843) has also been described from Darnley Island, Torres Straits.

References

  Tucker, J.K. 2004 Catalog of recent and fossil turrids (Mollusca: Gastropoda). Zootaxa 682:1–1295

External links
 

quisqualis
Gastropods described in 1843